William Sullivan (July 4, 1853 – November 13, 1884) was an Irish born Major League Baseball player.

He was born in Ireland and died in Holyoke, Massachusetts.

External links

Chicago White Stockings players
1853 births
1884 deaths
Major League Baseball players from Ireland
Irish baseball players
Irish emigrants to the United States (before 1923)
Manchester (minor league baseball) players
Holyoke (minor league baseball) players
19th-century baseball players